Long Lake Sagamore Seaplane Base  is a privately owned, public use seaplane base on Long Lake in the Town of Long Lake, Hamilton County, New York, United States.

Facilities and aircraft 
Long Lake Sagamore Seaplane Base resides at elevation of 1,629 feet (497 m) above mean sea level. It has one seaplane landing area designated ALL/WAY with a water surface measuring 15,000 by 2,000 feet (4,572 x 610 m).

For the 12-month period ending September 15, 2011, the airport had 60 general aviation aircraft operations. At that time there were one single-engine aircraft based at this airport.

See also 
 Long Lake Helms Seaplane Base (FAA: NY9) located at

References

External links 

 Aerial image as of May 1994 from USGS The National Map
 

Airports in New York (state)
Seaplane bases in the United States
Transportation in Hamilton County, New York
Adirondacks